Josef Hermann Tautenhayn (May 5, 1837 - April 1, 1911) was an Austrian medalist, sculptor, and professor.

Biography
Tautenhayn was born in Vienna, where he studied at the Academy of Fine Arts Vienna (1854–60) under Carl Radnitzky (1818-1901) and sculpture under Franz Lukas Bauer (1798-1872), then in the engravers' academy of the Imperial mint. After his return from a study trip through Italy, France, and England, undertaken in 1869–72, he was appointed Imperial engraver of coins and medals, and in 1881 professor at the academy.

Works
Among a large number of choice medals those commemorating the coronation of Francis Joseph as king of Hungary (1867), the Imperial Silver Wedding (1879), and the bicentennial of the Relief of Vienna from the Turks (1883), are the most noteworthy. His plastic work on a large scale includes a group of the “Birth of Athens,” and statues for the University of Vienna, also statues for the Art-Historical Museum and the Houses of Parliament.

He was one of the sculptors, namely Carl Kundmann and Hugo Haerdtl, who worked with the erection of The Athena Fountain (Pallas-Athene-Brunnen) in front of the Austrian Parliament.

See also
 Medallic art

Notes

References

External links
  Tautenhayn, Josef in: Wladimir Aichelburg 150 Jahre Künstlerhaus Wien 1861-2011 (Member of the Vienna Art Cooperative), German

Artists from Vienna
Austrian male sculptors
1837 births
1911 deaths
20th-century Austrian sculptors
19th-century Austrian sculptors
Academy of Fine Arts Vienna alumni
Academic staff of the Academy of Fine Arts Vienna
Austrian medallists
20th-century Austrian male artists